Kakhovka is a port city on the Dnieper River in Kakhovka Raion, Kherson Oblast, of southern Ukraine. It hosts the administration of the Kakhovka urban hromada, one of the hromadas of Ukraine. It had a population of 

It is home to the KZEZO (Electro-Welding Equipment Plant) and the Tavria Games festival.

Administrative status 
In 1972, the Verkhovna Rada of the Ukrainian SSR gave the city the rank of city of oblast significance within Kherson Oblast. Until 18 July 2020, Kakhovka served as the administrative center of Kakhovka Raion though it did not belong to the raion. In July 2020, as part of the administrative reform of Ukraine, which reduced the number of raions of Kherson Oblast to five, the city of Kakhovka was merged into Kakhovka Raion. Simultaneously, the raion center was moved to Nova Kakhovka.

History
The settlement was first established in 1492 by Mengli I Giray as İslâm Kermen (Islam-fortress), while locally became known as Aslan city (Aslan-horod). The fortress was situated next to one of the Dnieper crossings, Tavan crossing. The fortress was razed to the ground in 1695 during the Muscovites Azov campaigns led by Boris Sheremetiev and assisted by Hetman of Zaporizhian Host Ivan Mazepa.

Soon after the annexation of Crimea by the Russian Empire, in 1791 the Russian Colonel D.M. Kulikovsky built in place of former Crimean fortress the trade town of Kakhovka. It was named in honor of the Taurida Oblast governor Vasiliy Kakhovsky. In 1848 the town obtained city rights. In the 1870s–90s the town was renowned for having a huge population of low-income contractors (batraki).  According to N.J. Tjezjakov, a Russian economist, between 20,000 and 40,000 batraki would gather in the city at the one time, 80% of them males.

In December 1918, by the decision of the administration of the Dnipro povit (uyezd), Kakhovka was declared a city. In August 1920, during the final push in the Russian Civil War to drive the Whites under Wrangel out of the Crimea, Ieronim Uborevich established a bridgehead as part of the Northern Taurida Operation at Kakhovka, which became the site of fierce battles, which Evan Mawdsley described as "probably the closest the Civil War came to world war trench fighting."

During World War II, Kakhovka was captured by the Wehrmacht on August 30, 1941, as part of Operation Barbarossa. The Germans operated a Nazi prison in the town. It was retaken by the 4th Ukrainian Front during the Melitopol Offensive in the Battle of the Dnieper on November 2, 1943.

The city was captured on 24 February 2022 by Russian troops during the 2022 Russian invasion of Ukraine. They later pushed on to Mykolaiv, searching for way to cross the Southern Bug river.

Cultural influence
The 1935 film Three Friends (Три товарища) included the song "Kakhovka" (words by Mikhail Svetlov and music by Isaak Dunayevsky), which became very well known, especially the refrain "" ("We are peaceful people, but our armored train/ Stands [ready] on the siding"). Svetlov chose the site of the little-known Civil War battle for his song because he had grown up nearby and had known the town during the war.

The Tavria Games are a popular open air music festival that take place in the town each year.

Notable people
 Alexander Spendiaryan, composer, born in Kakhovka.
 Olia Hercules, British-Ukrainian food writer, grew up in Kakhovka.

References

External links
 The murder of the Jews of Kakhovka during World War II, at Yad Vashem website.

 
Cities in Kherson Oblast
Taurida Governorate
Cities of regional significance in Ukraine
Holocaust locations in Ukraine
Populated places on the Dnieper in Ukraine
Populated places of Kakhovka Reservoir
Kakhovka Raion